"No Te Contaron Mal" (English: "They Did Not Tell You Wrong") is a song by Mexican singer-songwriter Christian Nodal released on September 7, 2018 as a single. "No Te Contaron Mal" was written by Nodal, Gussy Lau, and American songwriter and producer Edgar Barrera.

"Nada Nuevo" reached number one on the Top 20 General Mexican Songs Chart and number ten on the Billboard Top Latin Songs chart in the United States.

Charts

Year-end charts

Certifications

See also
List of number-one songs of 2018 (Mexico)

References

2018 songs
2018 singles
Mexican folk songs
Ranchera songs
Spanish-language songs
Universal Music Latin Entertainment singles
Monitor Latino Top General number-one singles
Christian Nodal songs
Songs written by Edgar Barrera
Songs written by Christian Nodal
Latin Grammy Award for Best Regional Mexican Song